René Edward De Russy Hoyle (September 16, 1883 – November 1, 1981) was a major general in the United States Army.

Early life
Hoyle was born in New York on September 16, 1883.  He was the son of Brigadier General Eli DuBose Hoyle (1851–1921) and Fanny De Russy (1857–1925).  His maternal grandfather was Brigadier General René Edward De Russy.

He attended the U.S. Military Academy at West Point, N.Y., graduating in 1906.

Career
After graduating from the United States Military Academy, he was assigned to the artillery.  Later he would become Professor of Military Science and Tactics at Yale University.

In February 1942, he was promoted to brigadier general, nominated by President Roosevelt and confirmed by the United States Senate, along with sixteen others.  During World War II, he would command the 9th Infantry Division. His retirement was effective as of August 31, 1945.

He was awarded the Army Distinguished Service Medal on July 9, 1918, by the President of the United States "for exceptionally meritorious and distinguished services to the Government of the United States, in a duty of great responsibility during World War I. As Executive Officer and later as Assistant Commandant of the School of Fire for Field Artillery, Fort Sill, Oklahoma, during the period from November 1917 to May 1919, Colonel Hoyle displayed remarkable tact and excellent judgment, combined with executive and professional ability of a high order in positions of great responsibility, thereby contributing materially toward bringing that school to a state of maximum efficiency in a time of great emergency."

He was also presented with the Legion of Merit "for exceptionally meritorious conduct in the performance of outstanding services to the Government of the United States as Commander, Camp Roberts, from 1942 to 1945."

Personal life
Hoyle was married to Christine Guilfoyle (1888–1967). Together, they were the parents of:

 René Edward De Russy Hoyle, Jr. (1912–1935), who died in an accident at the age of 22.
 Susie-Lane Hoyle (1912–2000), who married Devere Parker Armstrong (1906–1980).
 John Guilfoyle Hoyle (1916–1986)

Hoyle died on November 1, 1981, in West Haven, Connecticut. He is buried with Christine and Rene, Jr., as well as his parents, at Arlington National Cemetery.

References

External links
Generals of World War II

1883 births
1981 deaths
Recipients of the Legion of Merit
Military personnel from New York City
People from New York (state)
United States Army personnel of World War I
Yale University faculty
United States Military Academy alumni
Burials at Arlington National Cemetery
United States Army generals of World War II
United States Army generals
United States Army Field Artillery Branch personnel